The Troy Trojans were a professional baseball team that played in the National League from 1879 to 1882. During their four seasons in existence, the team had a record of 134-191.

Players

References

External links
Franchise index at Baseball-Reference and Retrosheet

Major League Baseball all-time rosters